Tony Macaulay (born Anthony Gordon Instone; 21 April 1944) is an English author, composer for musical theatre, and songwriter. He has won the British Academy of Songwriters, Composers and Authors Award twice as 'Songwriter of the Year' (1970 and 1977). He is a nine time Ivor Novello Awards winning songwriter. In 2007, he became the only British person to win the Edwin Forrest Award for outstanding contribution to the American theatre. Macaulay's best-known songs include "Baby Now That I've Found You" and "Build Me Up Buttercup" with The Foundations, "(Last Night) I Didn't Get to Sleep at All," as well as "Love Grows (Where My Rosemary Goes)" and "Don't Give Up on Us".

Career
Macaulay was born in Fulham, London, England.

In the early 1960s he worked as a song plugger for Essex Publishing, then moved to Pye Records as a record producer. It was here that he had his first major success with The Foundations, when they recorded, "Baby Now That I've Found You", a song he had co-written with John Macleod, and it topped the UK Singles Chart in November 1967.  

Further hits came with songs such as Marmalade's "Baby Make It Soon" and "Falling Apart at the Seams"; The 5th Dimension's "(Last Night) I Didn't Get to Sleep at All", David Soul's "Don't Give Up on Us", plus Donna Summer's 1977 single "Can't We Just Sit Down (And Talk It Over)", all of which he wrote on his own. Many others came in collaboration with other songwriters, amongst them were Long John Baldry's "Let the Heartaches Begin", Paper Dolls' "Something Here in My Heart (Keeps A Tellin' Me No)" and Pickettywitch's "That Same Old Feeling", all co-written with John Macleod.  Another success for The Foundations was "Build Me Up Buttercup", written by Macaulay and Mike D'Abo. Scott Walker's "Lights of Cincinnati", The Hollies' "Sorry Suzanne", The New Seekers' "You Won't Find Another Fool Like Me", David Soul's "Silver Lady", and The Flying Machine's "Smile a Little Smile for Me" were penned with Geoff Stephens; while Edison Lighthouse's "Love Grows (Where My Rosemary Goes)", was written with Barry Mason. In addition, he co-wrote The Fortunes' "Here Comes That Rainy Day Feeling Again", Johnny Johnson and the Bandwagon's "Blame It on the Pony Express" and Andy Williams' "Home Lovin' Man", with Roger Cook and Roger Greenaway.

Much of his attention in the early 1970s was diverted by a protracted legal dispute with his publishers. He won his case on appeal in 1974, in a landmark decision which encouraged other artists to challenge the terms of their contracts. By this time he had begun to turn his back on writing pop songs and started to write for musical theatre. His first collaborations for the stage were with the playwright Ken Hill on Is Your Doctor Really Necessary? in 1973, and on Gentlemen Prefer Anything the following year.

He composed the scores to the films The Beast in the Cellar (1970) and Percy's Progress (1974), and was the music co-ordinator for the film Never Too Young to Rock (1975). He also wrote the music for Windy City, a musical in two acts based on The Front Page by Ben Hecht and Charles MacArthur, with book and lyrics by Dick Vosburgh, which was premiered on stage in 1982.

Later Macaulay turned to writing thrillers.

References

External links
 Official website

1944 births
Living people
English songwriters
English male composers
English record producers
English thriller writers
People from Fulham
The Foundations
Jewish songwriters
English people of German-Jewish descent
Musicians from London